Alejandro Fernández Almendras (born 1971) is a filmmaker from southern Chile who is best known for slow-moving naturalistic dramas.

Select filmography
 Huacho (2009)
 Sentados frente al fuego (2011)
 To Kill a Man (2014)
 Much Ado About Nothing (2016)
 My friend Alexis (2019)

References

External links

Chilean film directors
Living people
1971 births